Martina Arroyo (born February 2, 1937) is an American operatic soprano who had a major international opera career from the 1960s through the 1980s. She was part of the first generation of black opera singers to achieve wide success.

Arroyo first rose to prominence at the Zurich Opera between 1963 and 1965, and then was one of the Metropolitan Opera's leading sopranos between 1965 and 1978. During those years at the Metropolitan Opera, she was also a regular presence at the world's  opera houses, performing on the stages of La Scala, Covent Garden, the Opéra National de Paris, the Teatro Colón, the Deutsche Oper Berlin, the Vienna State Opera, the Lyric Opera of Chicago, and the San Francisco Opera. She is best known for her performances of the Italian spinto repertoire, and in particular, her portrayals of Verdi and Puccini heroines. Her last opera performance was in 1991, after which she has devoted her time to teaching singing on the faculties of various universities in the United States and Europe. On December 8, 2013, Arroyo received a Kennedy Center Honor.

Early years
Arroyo was born in New York City, the younger of two children of Demetrio Arroyo, originally from Puerto Rico, and Lucille Washington, a native of Charleston, South Carolina. Her older brother grew up to become a Baptist minister. The family lived in Harlem near St. Nicholas Avenue and 111th Street. Her father was a mechanical engineer at the Brooklyn Navy Yard and earned a good salary which enabled Arroyo's mother to stay at home with their children. His job also allowed the family to experience New York's cultural offerings and the family frequented museums, concerts, and the theatre. It was attending several performances of Broadway shows during the 1940s that first inspired Arroyo's interest in becoming a performer. Her mother humored her dreams and allowed Arroyo to take ballet classes. Her mother was also a talented amateur classical pianist and taught her daughter to play the instrument. Arroyo's other musical experiences as a child were largely through singing in the choirs at her Baptist church and as a student at Hunter College High School.

Hunter College
After finishing high school in 1953, Arroyo attended Hunter College where she earned a B.A. in Romance languages in 1956 at the age of nineteen. While there she studied voice as a hobby in an opera workshop with Joseph Turnau. Turnau recognized that Arroyo was a major talent who just needed proper training. After the workshop ended, he introduced her to voice instructor Marinka Gurewich, who immediately accepted her  as a student. When Arroyo did not take her training as seriously as her teacher wanted, Gurewich eventually threatened to end their lessons. Arroyo said of the incident,

She further explained that at that point most of the major opera houses, including the Metropolitan Opera, had never cast a black singer, so in her mind "opera wasn't a real possibility." Gurewich's threat, however, forced her to take her studies more seriously and she continued to study with her until Gurewich's death in 1990. Another important partnership formed around this time was with concert manager Thea Dispeker who, after attending one of Arroyo's recitals, offered her services at no charge until Arroyo's career took off. Dispeker helped manage much of Arroyo's career over the next several decades.

Career as a social worker
After graduating from college, Arroyo was faced with the difficulty of working while trying to study singing. On the advice of her mother, she became an English teacher at Bronx High School in the Fall of 1956 but found it difficult to balance her teaching responsibilities with continued training under Gurewich. She decided to leave her teaching position and take work as a social worker at the East End Welfare Center. For two years, she managed a case load of over 100 welfare recipients while continuing her voice training. Arroyo found the work fulfilling and stated of the experience, "My life had been centered on music for so long, and suddenly there I was, deeply involved in other people's problems,".

Metropolitan Opera
In 1957 Arroyo auditioned for the Metropolitan Opera but was not accepted. Somewhat disheartened, she flirted with the idea of becoming an academic and began working on a master's degree in comparative literature at New York University with a dissertation on Ignacio Silone's Pane e Vino and Vino e Pane. The following year she competed in and won the Metropolitan Opera's Audition of the Air competition (precursor to its National Council Auditions), earning a $1,000 cash prize and a scholarship to the Met's Kathryn Long School. She left NYU and entered the Kathryn Long School in the Fall of 1957 where she studied singing, drama, German, English diction, and fencing. While at the school, she was offered the role of the first coryphée in the American premiere of Ildebrando Pizzetti's Murder in the Cathedral to be performed at a festival in upstate New York. The concert, however, was rained out and was rescheduled for a performance at Carnegie Hall instead on September 17, 1958. This marked Arroyo's first professional appearance singing in an opera. The New York Times said of her performance, "Martina Arroyo is a gifted soprano who appears to have remarkable potential, and she sang with a voice of amplitude and lovely color."

In February 1959 Arroyo sang the title role in Gluck's Iphigénie en Tauride in a concert version with the Little Orchestra Society at Town Hall. Shortly thereafter she made her debut on the opera stage at the Metropolitan Opera as the Celestial Voice in Giuseppe Verdi's Don Carlo on March 14, 1959 with Eugenio Fernandi in the title role, Leonie Rysanek as Elizabeth, Robert Merrill as Rodrigo, and Nell Rankin as Princess Eboli. This was the beginning of a long association with the Met and the beginning of a lengthy career on the opera stage.

Musical career
After having made her Met debut, Arroyo moved to Europe where she began to appear in roles with minor opera houses in 1959. While performing in Italy of that year she met her future husband, professional violist Emilio Poggioni. The marriage ended in divorce and she later was married to Michel Maurel until his death in 2011. Over the next several years Arroyo worked mostly in Europe in mostly smaller roles, failing to land the larger name-making roles. Those larger parts which she did get were mostly in more obscure works. During 1961 and 1962 she went back and forth between Europe and the Metropolitan Opera frequently, with her roles at the Met during this period being in Richard Wagner's The Ring Cycle and in reprises of Don Carlo. Her roles in the Ring included the Third Norn and Woglinde in Götterdämmerung, Woglinde in Das Rheingold, Ortlinde in Die Walküre, and the Forest Bird in Siegfried.

In 1963 Arroyo's first major break came when she was offered a contract to join the Zurich Opera as a principal soprano. She made her debut there in the title role of Verdi's Aida where she was received enthusiastically. She continued to sing regularly at that opera house through 1968.

Aida became an important role for Arroyo early in her career, serving as a calling card for her at many major opera houses during the 1960s. She sang the role for her first appearance at the Hamburg State Opera in 1963 and at both the Deutsche Oper Berlin and the Vienna State Opera in 1964. In February of the following year she sang Aida in her first starring role at the Met as a last minute replacement for Birgit Nilsson. The performance received rave reviews with The New York Times praising Arroyo as "one of the most gorgeous voices before the public today." Rudolf Bing, the Met's director, immediately offered her a contract to join the roster of the company's principal sopranos which extended for several years.

In 1964 Arroyo broke new ground outside the traditional opera house by making an appearance on national network television in the production of Feliz Borinquen for the CBS Repertoire Workshop under the musical direction of Alfredo Antonini. 

Arroyo began the 1965/66 season at the Met in October with a critically acclaimed performance of Elizabeth in Don Carlo. She immediately became a favorite singer at that house portraying mostly Verdi heroines and the Met became her principal home from that point up until 1978. Her other roles at the Met during these thirteen years included Aida, Amelia in Verdi's Un ballo in maschera, Cio-Cio-San in Giacomo Puccini's Madama Butterfly, Donna Anna in Mozart's Don Giovanni, Elvira in Verdi's Ernani, Lady Macbeth in Verdi's Macbeth, Leonora in Verdi's Il trovatore, Leonora in Verdi's La forza del destino, Liù in Puccini's Turandot, Maddalena in Umberto Giordano's Andrea Chénier, Santuzza in Pietro Mascagni's Cavalleria rusticana, and the title role in Amilcare Ponchielli's La Gioconda among others. She was also notably the first black person to portray the role of Elsa in Wagner's Lohengrin in 1968, not just at the Met, but in all of opera history.

International career
During her years at the Met, Arroyo would frequently travel to perform at other houses both in the United States and internationally. In 1968 she sang for the first time in Israel and made her first appearance in the United Kingdom as Valentine in a London concert performance of Meyerbeer's Les Huguenots. Later that year she made her debut at the Royal Opera at Covent Garden and the Philadelphia Lyric Opera Company, both singing the role of Aida. She returned to both companies a number of times during the 1970s as Verdi heroines and in parts like the title roles in Puccini's Tosca and Richard Strauss's Ariadne auf Naxos. She sang Amelia in Un ballo in maschera for her debuts with both the San Francisco Opera (1971) and the Lyric Opera of Chicago (1972). She returned to Chicago to sing her first Amelia Grimaldi in Verdi's Simon Boccanegra in 1974. In 1972 she sang Aida for her debut at La Scala opposite Plácido Domingo as Radames. In 1973 she made her first appearances at the Opéra National de Paris and the Teatro Colón in Buenos Aires. In 1977 she made her debut with the Opera Company of Philadelphia portraying Senta in Wagner's The Flying Dutchman and in 1979 made her debut with Michigan Opera Theatre as Lenora in Il trovatore. She remained very busy in the world's major opera houses through 1979 singing mostly Verdi, Puccini, and Strauss heroines and other roles from the lirico-spinto repertoire. Arroyo portrayed herself in an episode of The Odd Couple titled "Your Mother Wears Army Boots", which originally aired on January 16, 1975. The episode also featured Howard Cosell who is portrayed to be a big fan of hers.

Retirement
By 1980, Arroyo became much more selective of the roles she chose to sing. She returned to the Met in 1983 to sing "Fu la sorte" from Verdi's Aida (with Mignon Dunn) for the company's Centennial Gala.  She returned to sing Aida and Santuzza; making her last appearance and 199th performance at the Metropolitan Opera on October 31, 1986. In 1987, she sang her last portrayal of the title role in Turandot with the Seattle Opera and in 1989, she announced her retirement from the operatic stage. She came out of retirement in 1991 for one last performance in the world premiere of Leslie Adams's Blake, an opera whose story is set in pre-Civil War America when slavery was still a reality.

Throughout her career, Arroyo was also a frequent performer of the concert repertoire and appeared with many of the world's leading symphony orchestras. She performed often with the New York Philharmonic under conductor Leonard Bernstein who particularly admired her voice in such repertoire as Beethoven's Ninth Symphony and Missa Solemnis.

Arroyo's talents also extended beyond the concert stage into the realm of live network television. In 1964 she appeared with the CBS Symphony Orchestra under the conductor Alfredo Antonini in the episode "Feliz Borinquen" of the CBS Repertoire Workshop as herself.

Martina Arroyo is a recipient of a 2010 Opera Honors Award from the National Endowment for the Arts.

Recordings

Having performed in the major opera houses and with the greatest symphony orchestras of the world, she has left a legacy of recordings, including: Handel's Judas Maccabeus (twice) and Samson, Mozart's Don Giovanni (Donna Elvira for Karl Böhm and Donna Anna for Sir Colin Davis), Beethoven's Missa solemnis and Ninth Symphony, Rossini's Stabat mater, Verdi's I vespri siciliani, Un ballo in maschera, La forza del destino (in both the St. Petersburg and revised versions), and the Messa da requiem and Mahler's massive Eighth Symphony the Symphony of a Thousand.

She sang in the world premieres of two works: Karlheinz Stockhausen's Momente and Samuel Barber's Andromache's Farewell.

Arroyo's discography (which also includes an aria recital), though enviable, does not encompass anything like the full range of roles she played on stage. At the Metropolitan Opera alone, these are the operas she performed but never recorded commercially: Verdi's Ernani, Macbeth, Il trovatore, and Don Carlos (the Celestial Voice as well as Elizabeth, both in Italian); Wagner's Lohengrin and Der Ring des Nibelungen (featured roles in all four operas); Ponchielli's La Gioconda; Giordano's Andrea Chénier; and Puccini's Madama Butterfly and Turandot (as Liù; she played the title role in Toronto).

Teaching career
Since her official retirement from singing in 1989 Arroyo has amassed significant teaching credits, including stints at Louisiana State University, UCLA, University of Delaware, Wilberforce University, the International Sommerakademie-Mozarteum in Salzburg and Indiana University.

She has given master classes nationally and internationally, and judged several competitions including the George London Competition and the Tchaikovsky International Competition./With  Willard L. Boyd, former President of the University of Iowa, she co-authored the "Task Force Report on Music Education in the U.S."

Honors
In 1976, she was appointed by President Gerald Ford to the National Council of the Arts in Washington, D.C. She founded the Martina Arroyo Foundation, which is dedicated to the development of emerging young opera singers by immersing them in complete role preparation courses. She is also active on the Boards of Trustees of Hunter College and Carnegie Hall. She was elected a Fellow of the American Academy of Arts and Sciences in 2000. She was candid about her perceived status as second-best to her great contemporary, fellow African-American spinto Leontyne Price; once, when a Met doorman greeted her as "Miss Price," she sweetly replied, "No, honey, I'm the other one."

See also 

 List of Puerto Ricans
History of women in Puerto Rico

References
Notes 

Sources
 Hamilton, David. (1987). The Metropolitan Opera Encyclopedia: A Comprehensive Guide to the World of Opera. New York, London, Toronto, Sydney, Tokyo: Simon and Schuster. p. 27. .
 Rosenthal, Harold and John Warrack. (1979, 2nd ed.). The Concise Oxford Dictionary of Opera. London, New York and Melbourne: Oxford University Press. p. 20. .
 Sadie, Stanley and Christina Bashford. (1992). The New Grove Dictionary of Opera. London: Macmillan Publishers Ltd. Vol. 1, p. 218. .
 Sadie, Stanley and John Tyrrell. (2001).The New Grove Dictionary of Music and Musicians. London: Macmillan Publishers Ltd. Vol. 2, p. 79. .
 Warrack, John and Ewan West. (1996 3rd ed.). The Concise Oxford Dictionary of Opera. New York: Oxford University Press. p. 22. .

External links
Martina Arroyo website
Martina Arroyo Foundation website

Discography (Capon's Lists of Opera Recordings)
MetOpera database
, featuring Arroyo in rehearsal with Karlheinz Stockhausen for Paris performance of Momente; Luc Ferrari, Pierre Schaeffer (1966), Groupe de Recherches Musicales, ORTF
Interview with Martina Arroyo, September 26, 1988

1937 births
Living people
20th-century African-American women singers
20th-century American women opera singers
African-American women opera singers
African-American academics
African-American educators
American musicians of Puerto Rican descent
American operatic sopranos
American social workers
American women academics
Angel Records artists
Centaur Records artists
Classical musicians from New York (state)
Fellows of the American Academy of Arts and Sciences
Hunter College alumni
Hunter College High School alumni
Indiana University faculty
Kennedy Center honorees
New York University alumni
Louisiana State University faculty
Metropolitan Opera people
Academic staff of Mozarteum University Salzburg
Musicians from New York City
University of California, Los Angeles faculty
University of Delaware faculty
Voice teachers
Wilberforce University faculty